Applied Logic Corporation (AL/COM) was a time-sharing company in the 1960s and 70s.

Headquartered in Princeton, New Jersey, AL/COM started in 1962 working on "mathematical techniques and their applications to problem-solving."

Seeing the need for in-house time sharing the company bought a Digital Equipment Corporation (DEC) PDP-6 and developed its time sharing service, which came on-line in 1966. In 1968 the company began development of "Mathematics Park" in Montgomery Township, New Jersey, "designed to provide tenants with a computer-serviced and mathematically-oriented environment," adjacent to the Princeton Airport. Also in 1968 the company registered AL/COM as a trademark for its service.  

The system involved both custom software and custom hardware, and the service was marketed nationally by a network of associates.

In the late 1960s the company developed a system called SAM (Semi-Automated Mathematics) for proving mathematical theories without human intervention. A theorem proved by the system, "SAM's lemma", was "widely hailed as the first contribution of automated reasoning systems to mathematics." The SAM series was one of the first interactive theorem provers and had an influence on subsequent theorem provers.

In 1965 Applied logic acquired a DEC PDP-6 computer system, which became operation in January, 1966. By 1969 the company had four DEC PDP-10 dual KL-10 systems with plans for a fifth, and had expanded nationwide with offices in San Jose, San Diego, and San Francisco.  The company also planned to market its time sharing systems in addition to providing services.  The company reported sales of $1,200,995, with an operational loss of $63,456.

By 1972 AL/COM had local dial-up facilities in ten cities: Boston, Massachusetts, Buffalo, New York, Chicago, Illinois, Indianapolis, Indiana, Montclair, New Jersey, New York, New York, Philadelphia, Pennsylvania, Princeton, New Jersey, Washington, DC, and Wilmington, Delaware.  The computer center was located in Mathematics Park in Princeton.

By late 1969 AL/COM had definite plans for CIT Leasing to leaseback $2.73 million USD of their equipment at Mathematics Park and was considering an additional $7.5 million more. By 1970 the company was in financial difficulty and negotiated an agreement to defer $1,300,000 of debt.  Applied Logic filed for Chapter XI bankruptcy in 1975.

References

External links
 A woman adjusting an Applied Logic Corporation (AL/COM) time sharing AL-10 computer system (photo at Getty Images)
 CRT-AIDED SEMI-AUTOMATED MATHEMATICS SAM Final Report
 Applied Logic Publications at Bitsavers

American companies established in 1962
American companies disestablished in 1975
Companies based in Princeton, New Jersey
Computer companies established in 1962
Computer companies disestablished in 1975
Defunct companies based in New Jersey
Defunct computer companies of the United States
Time-sharing companies